Klettermaxe is a 1927 German silent crime film directed by Willy Reiber and starring Dorothea Wieck,  and Paul Heidemann. The story was remade as a sound film in 1952.

It was made at the Bavaria Studios in Munich. The film's sets were designed by the art director Max Heilbronner.

Synopsis
A masked figure climbs into the apartments of burglars and robs them of their stolen goods.

Cast
 Dorothea Wieck, as Toni Höppner
 , as Corry Bell
 Ruth Weyher 
 Paul Heidemann 
 Carl Walther Meyer 
 Margarete Kupfer 
 Hans Adalbert Schlettow 
 Robert Garrison 
 Philipp Manning 
 Harry Hardt 
 Albert Paulig 
 Lilian Weiß
 Fritz Greiner 
 Neumann-Schüler

References

Bibliography
 Bock, Hans-Michael & Bergfelder, Tim. The Concise Cinegraph: Encyclopaedia of German Cinema. Berghahn Books, 2009.

External links

1927 films
Films of the Weimar Republic
German silent feature films
Films directed by Willy Reiber
1920s crime comedy films
Films about race and ethnicity
Films set in Berlin
Films based on German novels
German vigilante films
German crime comedy films
German black-and-white films
Bavaria Film films
Films shot at Bavaria Studios
1927 comedy films
Silent crime comedy films
1920s German films
1920s German-language films